Igor Arbutina (born 27 July 1972) is Croatian volleyball coach.

Career
Between 1992 and 2002 Arbutina worked as a coach at OK Karlovac, HAOK Mladost and OK Varazdin. From 1997 to 2002 he was an assistant coach of Croatian national team, and in 2002 became the head coach. In 2003–2007 he worked with MSC Moers and Rote Raben Vilsbiburg in Germany, and then became the head coach of the national team of Qatar.

Career
 OK Karlovac (1992–1993)
 OK Varazdin (1994–1996) (youth categories)
 OK Akademicar/HAOK Mladost (1996–1999)
 Evreux VC (1999–2000)
 HAOK Mladost (2000–2002)
 OK Varazdin (2003)
 MSC Moers (2003–2006)
 Rote Raben Vilsbiburg (2006–2007)
 Al Rayyan SC (2009–2011)
 Al Rayyan SC (2012)
 Al Rayyan SC (2014)
 Al Rayyan SC (2015/2016)
 Croatia (Junior national team) (2000–2002)
 Croatia Assistant Coach (1997–2001)
 Croatia (2002)
 Qatar (2007–2010)
 Qatar (2012–2014)

References

External links

 http://www.worldofvolley.com/wov-community/coaches/14/igor-arbutina.html[WorldofVolley Largest professional volleyball database on the internet]
 http://www.fivb.org/EN/volleyball/competitions/ClubWorldChampionships/Men/2014/MatchInfo.asp
 http://www.fivb.ch/En/Volleyball/Competitions/WorldChampionships/Men/2002/Index.asp [FIVB official web site]
 Igor Arbutina web page
 WorldofVolley Largest professional volleyball database on the internet
 FIVB official web page
 FIVB official web page

Croatian volleyball coaches
1972 births
Living people